The longfin snake-eel (Pisodonophis cancrivorus)  is an eel in the family Ophichthidae (worm/snake eels). It was described by John Richardson in 1848.

References

Ophichthidae
Fish described in 1848